Wonderboy Records was a British dance music record label and a subsidiary of Decca Music (and the parent label Universal Music). The label was active from 1995 to 2003. The brand was briefly resurrected for one release in 2005.

Releases

Notes

A  This release was ineligible for the UK Singles Chart due to being over 20 minutes in length and instead charted on the UK Budget Album Chart.

References

British record labels